Lytes Cary, Somerset may refer to:
The manor house called Lytes Cary
The settlement of Lytes Cary in the parish of Charlton Mackrell